Haim Estreya Ovadya (25 December 1922 – 26 August 1944) was a Macedonian Jewish communist who joined the Yugoslav Partisans after the German invasion of Yugoslavia in 1941 during World War II.

Life
Haim Estreya Ovadya was born in Bitola, Yugoslavia (now in North Macedonia) on 25 December 1922 to a very poor Jewish family. She was sponsored by the Women's International Zionist Organization to go to Belgrade find work or receive an education in 1938. She joined the Workers' Movement faction of the Communist Party of Yugoslavia (CPY) and was active in its women's sections.

After the bombing of Belgrade that began the invasion of Yugoslavia by the Axis Powers on 6 April 1941, she returned to Bitola where she was forced into a Jewish ghetto imposed by the Bulgarians in occupied Macedonia. She then became a supporter of the nascent communist Yugoslavian partisans while organizing meets of Jewish women in the ghetto to discuss women's rights. Ovadya formally became a member of the CPY in 1942. When the Central Committee of the Communist Party of Macedonia gave the Jewish community advance warning of the deportation of the Jews from Bitola on 10 March 1943 only a few Jews, Ovadya among them, took advantage of the shelter offered by the Communists.

Partisan career

The following month, she accepted the offer made by the partisans to fight the Axis forces and joined the new Goce Delcev partisan unit and then transferred to the Stiv Naumov Battalion when it was formed on 11 November. When the battalion was integrated into the 3rd Macedonian Brigade, Ovadya was appointed as the political commissar of her squad. Her unit helped to organize the founding meeting of the Anti-fascist Assembly for the National Liberation of Macedonia (Antifašističko Sobranie za Narodno Osloboduvanje na Makedonija) on 2 August 1944, which created the Republic of Macedonia.

Ovadya was appointed commissar of a battalion in the newly formed 7th Macedonian Brigade on 21 August and she was killed in combat with units of the Bulgarian Army on Kajmakčalan four days later. Ovadya was posthumously awarded the Order of the People's Hero and Bitola built a monument in her honor after the war.

Gallery

References

External links 

1922 births
1944 deaths
People from Bitola
Macedonian Jews
Jews in the Yugoslav Partisans
Jewish socialists
Yugoslav communists
Yugoslav Partisans members
20th-century Macedonian people
Women in the Yugoslav Partisans
Recipients of the Order of the People's Hero